The 2008 Armenian Premier League season (known as STAR National Football League due to sponsorship reasons) was the seventeenth since its establishment. It started on 6 April 2008, while the last matches were played on 15 November 2008. FC Pyunik were the defending champions. The Yerevan side won their seventh consecutive league title the previous season, their tenth overall. FC Dinamo Yerevan were supposed to be the team to get promoted, but they withdrew from the Premier League, and were disbanded.

On 30 April 2008, Football Federation of Armenia signed a contract with STAR retailing company by which STAR would become the sponsor of the 17th Armenian Premier League season, and henceforth the 2008 season would be called STAR National Football League.

The league was played in four stages. The teams played each other four times, twice at home and twice away. The champions would have been the team with the most points after round 28. However, since Pyunik and Ararat Yerevan were tied on points at the end of the season, they had to play a decision game for the championship.

Participating teams

League table

Decision game
Because Ararat and Pyunik were tied on points after the regular season, they played out the championship in a decision game.

Results

First half of season

Second half of season

Top goalscorers

Source: ffa.am

See also
 2008 Armenian First League
 2008 Armenian Cup

References

External links
 ffa.am
 soccerway.com
 rsssf.com

Armenian Premier League seasons
1
Armenia
Armenia